Robert L. Bergman (November 10, 1948 – November 29, 2013) was an American politician and businessman.

Born in Elgin, Illinois, Bergman graduated from Palatine High School. He then worked in his family's truck business; Bergman Trucking. He also served as highway commissioner for the Elgin Township. On November 14, 1996, Bergman was appointed to the Illinois House of Representatives and served until 1999. He was a Republican. He then worked for Red Arrow Construction and retired in 2012. Bergman died from esophageal cancer.

Notes

External links

1948 births
2013 deaths
People from Elgin, Illinois
People from Palatine, Illinois
Businesspeople from Illinois
Republican Party members of the Illinois House of Representatives
Deaths from cancer in Illinois
20th-century American businesspeople